Nussbaum is a surname of German origin. Variant spellings include Nußbaum and Nusbaum. The word means “one who dwells near trees”, likely referring to hazelnut trees or walnut trees.

People surnamed Nussbaum
 A. Edward Nussbaum (1925–2009), theoretical mathematician
 Adam Nussbaum (born 1955), American jazz drummer
 Alan Nussbaum (born 1947), American linguist
 Albert Frederick Nussbaum (1934–1996), bank robber and novelist
 Alex Nussbaum, comedian, actor and writer
 Arthur Nussbaum (1877–1964), German legal scholar
 Barry D. Nussbaum, American statistician
 Bernard Nussbaum (1937–2022), former White House Counsel under Bill Clinton
 Emily Nussbaum, American television critic
 Eugenie Nussbaum (1872–1940), Galician-Austrian philanthropist, writer and pedagogue developing and supporting Austrian girl education
Felicity Nussbaum, American professor of English
 Felix Nussbaum (1904–1944), a Jewish German painter
 Hedda Nussbaum, American masochist and child abuser, author of a memoir, Surviving Intimate Terrorism
 Howard Nusbaum (born 1954), American psychologist
 Joe Nussbaum, American film director
 Johann Nepomuk von Nussbaum (1829–1890), German surgeon
 Lowell Nussbaum (1901–1987), journalist 
 Martha Nussbaum (born 1947), American philosopher
 Mike Nussbaum (born 1923), American actor and director
 Myer Nussbaum (1855–1952), New York lawyer and politician
 Paul Joseph Nussbaum (1870–1935), American prelate of the Roman Catholic Church
 Roger Nussbaum, American mathematician
 Ronald Archie Nussbaum, American herpetologist
 Theo Nussbaum (1885–1956), German architect
 Tsvi C. Nussbaum (born 1935), Holocaust survivor

See also
 Nußbaum, a village in the Bad Kreuznach district in the Rhineland-Palatinate, Germany
 Nusbaum is a municipality in the district Bitburg-Prüm in Rhineland-Palatinate, Germany

German-language surnames
Jewish surnames